Michal Benedikovič (31 May 1923 – 18 April 2007) was a Slovak football player. He played for Czechoslovakia, for which he played 7 matches.

He was a participant at the 1954 FIFA World Cup.

Benedikovič played mostly for Slovan Bratislava.

References 

  Profile at ČMFS website
  Michal Benedikovič – futbalista, ktorého zničila ŠtB

1923 births
2007 deaths
Slovak footballers
Czechoslovak footballers
1954 FIFA World Cup players
Czechoslovakia international footballers
ŠK Slovan Bratislava players
FC Spartak Trnava players
Association football midfielders